Skin (2009) is a novel by British writer Mo Hayder. The novel is the fourth to feature her series character Jack Caffery.

References

2009 British novels
Bantam Books books